Maurizio Solaro di Moretta (1607 – 25 December 1655) was a Roman Catholic prelate who served as Bishop of Mondovi (1642–1655).

Biography
Maurizio Solaro di Moretta was born in Saluces, Italy in 1607.
On 16 June 1642, he was appointed during the papacy of Pope Urban VIII as Bishop of Mondovi.
On 22 June 1642, he was consecrated bishop by Alessandro Cesarini (iuniore), Cardinal-Deacon of Sant'Eustachio, with Alessandro Castracani, Bishop Emeritus of Nicastro, Patrizio Donati, Bishop of Minori, serving as co-consecrators. 
He served as Bishop of Mondovi until his death on 25 December 1655.

While bishop, he was the principal co-consecrator of Gerolamo Mascambruno, Bishop of Isernia (1642); and Francesco Agostino della Chiesa, Bishop of Saluzzo (1642).

References

External links and additional sources
 (for Chronology of Bishops) 
 (for Chronology of Bishops) 

17th-century Italian Roman Catholic bishops
Bishops appointed by Pope Urban VIII
Bishops of Mondovì
1607 births
1655 deaths